Isabel Township is one of twenty-six townships in Fulton County, Illinois, USA. At the 2010 census, its population was 192 and it contained 87 housing units.

Administration history
Township Supervisors

Town Clerks
Jesse Benson..........1850	        Robert G. Mulica..1872-73
William Craig.....1860	        Jesse Benson.........1874-77
Jesse Benson......1861-69	Stephen J. Benson.1878
Roland C. Benson..1870	        Thomas Brown......1879
Hugh Murrey...  ......1871

Local government

Township Supervisor
Greg Juergens (2005–Present)
Dennis Barr (2001-2005)
Gary Crum (1989-2001) Appointed
Larry Tarvin (?) Resigned
Carl Gowdy (?)

Town Clerk
Karen Hazzard (2018–Present) Appointed
Janice Colglazier (2008-2018) Resigned moved out of the township
Pat Robinson (1988-2008)

Road Commissioner

David Howe (2018–Present) Appointed
Robert Kessler (2017-2018) died August 25, 2018
Gary Whitmore (2015-2017) Appointed
Matt Stephens (2013-2015) Resigned
Dennis Barr (2005-2013)
Ed Weatherford (1997-2005)
Carrol Weaver (1980-1997)

Trustees
Monty Graham (      - Present)
Craig Porter (   -Present)
Tracy Tomm (2019–Present) Appointed
Chase Evans (2017–Present)

Mailing Address
P.O. Box 168 Lewistown, IL.  61542

Geography

Existing towns (unincorporated)
 Duncan Mills - Duncan's Mills is a small place of business with a post office on the Spoon River, deriving its name from the gris-tmill at the point formerly owned and operated by George Duncan, an early settler there, and a very highly respected citizen. From 1840 to 1855, perhaps for a greater length of time, his was the largest grist-mill within a radius of 15 to 20 miles.

Extinct towns
 Otto
 Spoon River village
 West Havana
 Point Isabel was an old shipping point on the Illinois River, at the mouth of the Spoon River and directly across from Havana, and was the southern terminus of the Fulton County Narrow Gauge railway connecting to Fairview and Galesburg.
 Bessler's Station (aka Barrett's Station) was a station on the Narrow Gauge Railroad until 1910.

Cemeteries
The township contains six cemeteries: Duncan, Farris, Foutch, Freeman, Kearney and Otto.

Major highways
  US Route 24
  US Route 136
  Illinois Route 78
  Illinois Route 100

Demographics

School districts
 Lewistown School District 97

Political districts
 Illinois' 17th congressional district
 State House District 94
 State Senate District 47

References
 
 United States Census Bureau 2007 TIGER/Line Shapefiles
 United States National Atlas

External links
 City-Data.com
 Illinois State Archives

Townships in Fulton County, Illinois
Townships in Illinois
1849 establishments in Illinois